Anna Konkina (born 14 July 1947 in Kirillovka, Penza Oblast) is a Russian retired cyclist. She won the UCI Road World Championships in 1970 and 1971 and finished in third place in 1967 and 1972.

References

1947 births
Living people
People from Penza Oblast
Russian female cyclists
Soviet female cyclists
UCI Road World Champions (women)
Sportspeople from Penza Oblast